Red nose or red noses may refer to:

Culture 
 A modern circus clown's red nose
 Rudolph the Red-Nosed Reindeer

Organizations and events 
 Operation Red Nose, a Christmastime volunteer anti-drunk-driving ferry service
 Red Nose Day, a UK charity telethon operated by Comic Relief
 Red Nose Day, a US charity telethon operated by Comic Relief, Inc.

Entertainment 
 "Red Nose", a 2013 song by Sage the Gemini
 Red Nose (film), a 2003 Canadian romantic comedy film also known as Nez rouge
 Red Noses, a 1985 comedy about the black death
 "Red Nose", a 2009 song by Tech N9ne from Sickology 101

Medicine 
 Red nose, a physiological response
 Alcohol intoxication, a facial feature
 Blushing, facial feature

See also 
 Rudolph the Red-Nosed Reindeer (disambiguation)

Disambiguation pages